Joseph Wilhelm Ernst, Prince of Fürstenberg (13 April 1699 - 29 April 1762) was a prince of Fürstenberg-Fürstenberg who changed his residence to Donaueschingen, at the head of the Danube, and thus converted the existing settlement into a town.

Early life 
Born as a member of the House of Fürstenberg Joseph was the second son of Landgrave Prosper von Fürstenberg-Stühlingen (1662–1704) and his wife, Countess Sophie Anna Eusebia von Königsegg-Rothenfels (1674–1727).

Title of Fürst 
On 2 December 1716 Joseph was awarded with the hereditary title of Fürst by Charles VI, Holy Roman Emperor.

Marriages and issue 
On 6 June 1723 he married Countess Maria Anna von Waldstein-Wartenberg, heiress of Pürglitz (1707-1756). They had six children:
 Joseph Wenzel (1728–1783)
 Karl Egon (1729 - 1787), married Countess Maria Josepha von Sternberg (1735-1803), had issue 
 Maria Augusta Josepha (1731–1770), Abbess in Hradčany
 Maria Henriette Josepha (1732–1772), married Alexander Ferdinand, 3rd Prince of Thurn and Taxis, had issue
 Maria Emmanuele Sophie (1733–1776)
 Maria Theresia Josepha (1736–1774)

In 1761 he married 37 years younger Countess Maria Anna von der Wahl (1736-1808). They didn't have children.

References

Fürstenberg (princely family)
German princes
Knights of the Golden Fleece of Austria